Jhalawad may refer to the following entities in India :

 Jhalawad, Gujarat, a town in Gujarat
 Jhalawad State, the former princely state with seat in the above town, which was renamed Dhrangadhra State after its capital was transferred
 one of the ten historical and for Raj-preserved prants (regions) of Kathiawar, along Halar, Sorath and Gohelwad
 hence still nickname of Surendranagar district, also in Gujarat, as many of its princely states were ruled by Jhala Rajputs
 Jhalawad, Rajasthan, a town in Rajasthan